The Railways women's cricket team is an Indian domestic cricket team and is run by the Railways Sports Promotion Board. The team has represented the state in Women's Senior One Day Trophy (List A) and  Senior women's T20 league. The team is known as the powerhouse of the women's Indian cricket as they dominated the competitions in both List A and T20 format. They also produced many players who would go up into the international scene.

Current squad
Mithali Raj (c)
Thirush Kamini
Punam Raut
Sabbhineni Meghana
Nuzhat Parween (wk)
Mona Meshram
Sneh Rana
Preeti Bose
Shweta Mane
Swagatika Rath
Arundhati Reddy
Rajeshwari Gayakwad
Ekta Bisht
Poonam Yadav
Meghna Singh

Honours
 Inter State Women's Competition:
 Winners (2): 2007–08, 2008–09
 Women's Senior One Day Trophy:
 Winners (13): 2006–07, 2007–08, 2008–09, 2009–10, 2010–11, 2012–13, 2013–14, 2014–15, 2015–16, 2016–17, 2017–18, 2020–21, 2021–22
 Women's Senior T20 Trophy:
 Winners (10): 2009–10, 2010–11, 2011–12, 2012–13, 2013–14, 2014–15, 2015–16, 2016–17, 2019–20, 2021–22

References

Women's cricket teams in India
Sport in Indian Railways